East Cape Girardeau is a village in Alexander County, Illinois, United States. The population was 289 at the 2020 census. It is part of the Cape Girardeau–Jackson, MO-IL Metropolitan Statistical Area.

History
A post office was established at East Cape Girardeau in 1874, and remained in operation until 1913. The village lies east of Cape Girardeau, Missouri, hence the name.

Geography
East Cape Girardeau is located at  (37.296030, -89.495237).

East Cape Girardeau is across the Mississippi River from Cape Girardeau, Missouri. The two are connected by the Bill Emerson Memorial Bridge which opened in December 2003 following the demolition of the Old Mississippi River Bridge constructed in 1928.

Demographics

As of the 2020 census there were 289 people, 153 households, and 83 families residing in the village. The racial makeup of the village was 82.70% White, 7.27% African American, 0.35% Asian, 0.69% from other races, and 9.00% from two or more races. Hispanic or Latino of any race were 2.77% of the population.

There were 153 households, out of which 66.01% had children under the age of 18 living with them, 45.75% were married couples living together, 2.61% had a female householder with no husband present, and 45.75% were non-families. 33.33% of all households were made up of individuals, and 21.57% had someone living alone who was 65 years of age or older. The average household size was 3.33 and the average family size was 2.80.

The village's age distribution consisted of 26.8% under the age of 18, 1.4% from 18 to 24, 31.3% from 25 to 44, 21.3% from 45 to 64, and 19.3% who were 65 years of age or older. The median age was 39.8 years. For every 100 females, there were 117.8 males. For every 100 females age 18 and over, there were 96.3 males.

The median income for a household in the village was $37,875, and the median income for a family was $48,194. Males had a median income of $34,554 versus $20,313 for females. The per capita income for the village was $17,811. About 8.4% of families and 27.7% of the population were below the poverty line, including 30.7% of those under age 18 and 2.4% of those age 65 or over.

References

Villages in Alexander County, Illinois
Villages in Illinois
Cape Girardeau–Jackson metropolitan area
Illinois populated places on the Mississippi River
1874 establishments in Illinois